Lorraine Burroughs (born 22 January 1981) is a British actress of stage and screen. She was born in Birmingham and attended Bishop Challoner RC School there. She later trained at RADA.

Burroughs is best known for her role in the play The Mountaintop for which she received an Olivier Award nomination for Best Actress in 2010.

Her TV appearances include DCI Banks, Lip Service, Top Boy, Spooks: Code 9 and All About George. Burroughs also starred in the New Tricks episode Good Morning Lemmings in 2010. She played Trix Warren in the 2012 film Fast Girls. She had lead roles as Serena Farley (Gorringe) in the 2013 three part drama The Ice Cream Girls and as DI Gina Conroy in Silent Witness episode Protection in 2015. In 2016, she appeared as Olga in the Christmas two-part special of Last Tango in Halifax on BBC1.

Her radio drama credits include The Colour Purple and Burned To Nothing.

She currently lives in London.

References

External links

1981 births
Living people
Actresses from Birmingham, West Midlands
Alumni of RADA
Black British actresses
English actresses
British people of Barbadian descent